Janine Bailly-Herzberg (1920-2005) was a French art historian, specialising in 19th century art.

Author
Bailly-Herzberg was an author as well. Her book Pissarro et Paris was published in 1992 by Flammarion. She also co-wrote L'eau-forte de Peintre Au Dix-neuvième Siècle: La Société Des Aquafortistes 1862-1867, published in 1972 by Leonce Laget, Correspondence of Camille Pissarro: 1886-1890, published by University Presses of France, and Daubigny which was published in 1975 by publishers Éditions Geoffroy-Dechaume.

Dictionnaire de l'estampe en France, 1830-1950
This is a 384-page-long dictionary. Just like Bailly-Herzberg's book Pissaro et Paris, this dictionary was also published by Flammarion in 1985.

References

1920 births
2005 deaths
French art historians